José Rodríguez (born 16 June 1945) is a Puerto Rican sailor. He competed in the Flying Dutchman event at the 1972 Summer Olympics.

References

External links
 

1945 births
Living people
Puerto Rican male sailors (sport)
Olympic sailors of Puerto Rico
Sailors at the 1972 Summer Olympics – Flying Dutchman
Place of birth missing (living people)